Khvorheh (also Romanized as Khorbeh, Khowrheh, Khūrheh, Khurreh, and Khvoreh) is a village in Khomeh Rural District, in the Central District of Aligudarz County, Lorestan Province, Iran. At the 2006 census, its population was 249, in 54 families.

References 

Towns and villages in Aligudarz County